The Type Four chassis was a shared front wheel drive platform used in the 1980s and 1990s for the Saab 9000, Fiat Croma, Lancia Thema and Alfa Romeo 164.

It emerged as an agreement between the four carmakers in October 1978 to reduce development costs on new top-of-the-range saloons, although it would be another six to nine years before the cars were launched. It was front-wheel drive, with optional four-wheel drive, and used a 4-wheel independent MacPherson strut suspension, except on the Saab.

The Saab and Lancia versions were the first cars to be launched in 1984, with the Fiat debuting a year later, and the line-up being completed in 1987 with the arrival of the Alfa Romeo.

The Fiat and Lancia looked much like the Saab, but the Alfa Romeo only shared the chassis. The wheelbase is 2.67 m (105 inches) on all models. The Saab and Fiat were launched as five-door hatchbacks and the Alfa Romeo and Lancia sold as four-door saloons. Lancia added the only Type Four estate in 1986 and Saab eventually added a saloon version of the 9000 in 1988.

Because the four cars were very similar, many parts can be exchanged between them regardless of brand. For example the windshield from the Croma can also be used on the 9000. Likewise the wing mirrors off both the 9000 and the Thema are almost identical (9000 has a pressed recess on the mirror casing, Thema is without recess) and should fit both cars with the doors being similar. Because its platform was shared closely with three other cars, the Saab 9000's ignition key was situated on the steering column instead of between the front seats like in other Saab models. Alfa Romeo differs most from other cars, it has for example an exclusive front suspension and has some chassis modifications. The Saab has a beam axle rear suspension, rather than the independent MacPherson found in all the other models. The front of the Saab is radically different from the Italian siblings due to the much improved crash protection.

The Thema was the first of the Type Four models to be replaced when it was succeeded by the Kappa in 1994 – which made use of a new Type E-platform which also spawned the 164's successor, the Alfa Romeo 166, in 1996. The Croma was axed in 1996 without an immediate replacement, while the 9000 was replaced in 1997 by the 1998 9-5, which was based on the Opel-derived GM2900 platform also shared with its 900 and 9-3 siblings.

The 164 was replaced by the Alfa Romeo 166 in 1998, signalling the end of the Type Four platform after 14 years in use.

On the 6th episode in the 9th season of the British motoring program Top Gear, James May welded together the front halves of a Saab 9000 and Alfa Romeo 164 to make a stretch limousine. He said the two cars should be entirely compatible because they had the same wheelbase and floor pan. It was nicknamed the "Salfa Romeaab".

References

External links
History Fiat Type Platform (archived)

Fiat platforms
Alfa Romeo platforms
Lancia platforms